Bhupathiraju Vissam Raju (1920-2002) is an Indian industrialist, a former chairman of Raasi Cements and the Cement Corporation of India and one of the pioneers of Indian cement industry. He was the director of Sagi Ramakrishnam Raju Constructions and Prasad and Company Project Works Limited. He was also interested in ceramics and refractory industries and is the founder of the Padmasri Dr. B.V Raju Institute of Technology. The Government of India awarded him the fourth-highest Indian civilian award of Padma Shri in 1977 and followed it with the third-highest honour of Padma Bhushan in 2001.

References

Recipients of the Padma Shri in civil service
Recipients of the Padma Bhushan in trade and industry
Indian industrialists
Indian businesspeople in cement
1920 births
2002 deaths
People from West Godavari district
Businesspeople from Andhra Pradesh